Makedonida is a former municipality in Imathia, Greece. Since the 2011 local government reform it is part of the municipality Veroia, of which it is a municipal unit. The municipal unit has an area of 199.926 km2. Population 1,646 (2011). The seat of the municipality was in Rizomata.

References

Populated places in Imathia